Paulo César Díaz Huincales (born 25 August 1994), known as Paulo Díaz, is a Chilean professional footballer who plays for Argentine club River Plate and the Chile national team.

International career
He got his first call up to the senior Chile squad for a friendly against the United States in January 2015 and made his international debut in the match.

Personal life
He is  the son of former defender Ítalo Díaz, who played for  the Chile national team in 2001. His younger brother, Nicolás, is a Chilean international footballer too.

Díaz Huincales is of Mapuche descent.

Notes

References

External links
 Díaz at Football-Lineups
 Paulo Díaz at playmakerstats.com (English version of ceroacero.es)
 

1994 births
Living people
Chilean people of Mapuche descent
Footballers from Santiago
Chilean footballers
Club Deportivo Palestino footballers
Chilean Primera División players
San Lorenzo de Almagro footballers
Al-Ahli Saudi FC players
Argentine Primera División players
Saudi Professional League players
Chilean expatriate footballers
Chilean expatriate sportspeople in Argentina
Expatriate footballers in Argentina
Chilean expatriate sportspeople in Saudi Arabia
Expatriate footballers in Saudi Arabia
Chile international footballers
2017 FIFA Confederations Cup players
2019 Copa América players
Association football defenders
Mapuche sportspeople
Indigenous sportspeople of the Americas